Shushan the Palace: Hymns of Earth is a 2003 album by Jane Siberry.

It is her third Christmas-themed album, following 1994's Count Your Blessings, a live concert she performed with Holly Cole, Rebecca Jenkins, Mary Margaret O'Hara and Victoria Williams, and 1997's Child: Music for the Christmas Season.

On Shushan the Palace, Siberry interprets several Christmas liturgical hymns by classical composers.

Track listing
"How Beautiful Are the Feet"  – 3:35 - George Frideric Handel/Charles Jennens
"Sheep May Safely Graze"  – 3:43 - Johann Sebastian Bach/Salomo Franck
"A Star Shall Rise Up Out of Jacob"  – 1:39 - Felix Mendelssohn/J. F. Von Bunsen 
"I Know That My Redeemer Liveth"  – 6:07 - George Frideric Handel/Charles Jennens
"Lo, How a Rose E'er Blooming"  – 4:49 - Friedrich Layritz/John C. Mattes/Krauth Spaeth
"In the Bleak Midwinter"  – 4:19 - Gustav Holst/Christina Rossetti
"Jesus Christ the Apple Tree"  – 3:05 - lyric collected by Joshua Smith, music by Elizabeth Poston
"Break Forth, O Beauteous Heavenly Light"  – 4:48 - Johann Rist/Johann Schop
"If God Be for Us"  – 4:22 - Handel/Jennens with additional lyrics by Peter Kiesewalter

See also
 Shushan Palace

2003 Christmas albums
Jane Siberry albums
Christmas albums by Canadian artists